The 1923 season of the Auckland Rugby League was its 15th. The First Grade competition featured 7 teams with the Fire Brigade club who featured in it in 1922 not entering a team.

First grade winners 
City Rovers won their 6th championship title and the 3rd in succession after defeating Athletic 8–7 in the final. With a round to play City was only 2 competition points ahead of Athletic so it was decided to play a final to decide the champions. The match was played on Carlaw Park in front of an enormous crowd of 11,500 with £325 received in gate takings. City were the second team to win three consecutive titles after Ponsonby United had won the competition in 1917, 1918, and 1919. It was to be 61 years until it happened again with Mt Albert winning the title from 1984–86 before Northcote won 4 titles from 1991–94, Glenora 3 titles from 1997–99, and Pt Chevalier won 3 titles from 2013–15.

Ponsonby won the Roope Rooster Knockout competition for the second straight year and their third time in the competitions history after defeating City Rovers 14–3 in the final.

Representative team 
The Auckland representative team played 5 matches for 4 wins and a 20–20 draw. The draw was arguably the most significant result as it was in a match for the Northern Union Challenge Cup against South Auckland. Auckland had lost the cup to the same opposition the previous season and as the match was drawn South Auckland retained it. The two teams met again at the end of the season at Carlaw Park which Auckland won convincingly however the cup was not being played for as it was only defended at the holders home ground.

Manukau rugby league team 
Near the end of the season the Manukau and Mangere clubs sent a letter to the Auckland Rugby League which was read at the management committee meeting on 29 August. It stated that the two clubs had decided to amalgamate and would enter a team in the senior grade the following year provided permission was granted, which it was. The Manukau club is the Manukau club of today, though the Mangere club is not related to the modern day Mangere East who were not founded until 1963. The Manukau club were located in their early decades in the Onehunga area before moving much later to their current location at Moyle Park.

Monteith Shield (1st grade championship) 
The 1923 First Grade Championship was arguably the most keenly fought in the competitions history to this point with three teams in the hunt for the title up until the last two weeks. Marist Old Boys who were in a good position to win the title lost in the 12th and 13th rounds and bowed out of contention, leaving City Rovers and Athletics to contend. It was ultimately won by City Rovers who finished the season with a 10 win and 2 loss record, as did Athletic, with a final being required to determine the winner. City won by the narrowest of margins 8–7 to go back to back.

Monteith Shield standings 
{|
|-
|

A final was played between City Rovers and Athletic after the round robin to decide the title with City winning 8 points to 7 in front of 11,500 spectators at Carlaw Park.

Monteith Shield fixtures 
The First Grade season was particularly close right until the end. In the final round the step was made to play both games on Carlaw Park number 1 field for the first time (usually one match was always played on the number 2 field at the same time). If Athletic had defeated City Rovers in the main match they would have won the championship for the first time however they lost to City which forced a final to be played the following week between the same two teams and City were again victorious to claim their 3rd straight championship.

Round 1

Round 2

Round 3

Round 4

Round 5

Round 6

Round 7

Round 8
Ponsonby defaulted their match with Newton after they could only manage 8 players.

Round 9

Round 10
Richmond defaulted their match with City as they had a large number of players injured or ill.

Round 11

Round 12

Round 13

Round 14
The match between City and Athletic saw two forwards ordered off, one from each team. Hec McDonald the future Kiwi debuted for City in the match after being drawn to Auckland from the Waikato.

Championship final

Roope Rooster knockout competition 
The Roope Rooster competition was interesting as Ponsonby went on to win it despite being uncompetitive in the First Grade competition. Thomas McClymont and Bill Walsh emerged from retirement, and Ivan Littlewood transferred back to the club from Waikato where he had moved, to bolster their team for the Roope Rooster competition. They defeated Richmond and Marist comprehensively before beating a slightly weakened City team (with Maurice Wetherill suffering from influenza, and Bill Davidson with a leg injury) in the final 14–8.

Round 1
Athletic had a forward ordered off early in their match with Devonport United but still managed to lead at halftime before conceding the lead and the match in the second half.

Semi finals

Final

Top try scorers and point scorers
These lists include tries and points scored in the first grade competition and the Roope Rooster knockout competition. A Goddick of the Devonport who scored 6 tries during the season later moved to Fiji to live and help promote the game of rugby union there.

Other senior club matches and competitions

Athletic v Wednesday representative team
During the season a Wednesday afternoon competition was played and it was decided to play a match between Athletic who had a bye and a representative team from that competition as curtain-raiser to the City Rovers – Marist Old Boys match.

Labour Day Carnival and charity sevens tournament 
On 20 October there was a carnival held at Carlaw Park with 7 a-side football on one field and seven-a-side rugby league on the other. There were three first round matches played with Richmond, Athletic A, and Devonport victorious. Richmond received a bye in the semi-finals and met Athletic in the final who they defeated 5 points to 0.

The following weekend another seven-a-side tournament was held at Carlaw Park to raise money for the Takapuna Orphanage which was destroyed by fire. Unfortunately the weather was particularly bad in the morning which had an effect on the attendance with only 1,000 spectators. The teams were supposed to composed of senior players but in reality were largely made up of junior players.

Exhibition matches 
On June 2 Marist had a bye and so travelled to Hamilton to play a local Hamilton representative side. Hamilton won 28-13 against a Marist team missing 5 of its regular players.

Richmond travelled to Taumarunui towards the end of the season when they had a bye in the First Grade competition and were victorious against the local side by 14 points to 5. On 15 September the Athletic and Parnell 4th grade teams played a match in Whangarei which was the first time and organised game of rugby league had been played in the area. As both of the teams were composed of junior players, the game was not of a high standard and gained little interest.

Lower grades 
There were 8 lower grade competitions in 1923 with the 6th grade split into an A and B division, while the Cadets competition ran again and a Wednesday Competition was also run featuring businesses and professions.

Second grade
City Rovers won the competition after defeating Mangere Rangers 16-3 on September 8. Earlier in the season on June 2 the two sides drew 6-6 but the match was later awarded to Mangere as City had an "unqualified" player. The standings are incomplete with most teams playing around 14 matches but less than half were reported. On August 14 with the competition nearing its end the New Zealand Herald reported that Mangere were on 20 points, City 16, and Otahuhu and Kingsland were on 14. City had 2 games in hand and it appears Mangere must have lost their last match with city winning both of there's and forcing a playoff for the competition on September 8, which they won.  Northcote & Birkenhead Ramblers withdrew after 7 rounds and had defaulted at least two matches to that point.
{|
|-
|

Third grade (Myers Cup)
The points for the five leading teams was mentioned in an article in the New Zealand Herald on August 14 when City and Manukau had no games remaining while Richmond, Ponsonby, and Point Chevalier each had two games left. After wins by Ponsonby and Point Chevalier they overtook City and Manukau and needed a playoff for the title. Ponsonby United won the competition, defeating Point Chevalier in the final 10-7 on September 15. Ellerslie, Kingsland and Marist all withdrew after round 7. Each of them had defaulted multiple matches prior to this. 16 rounds were played in total but there were few results reported, though the majority of Ponsonby's matches did have their result published. The Victoria Cruising Club entered a team. They were a boating club based in West Haven.
{|
|-
|

Fourth grade
Devonport United won the championship on September 29 when they beat Athletic 24-5 in the final. Neither team had many of their results reported and therefore the standings are very incomplete although the New Zealand Herald gave the points of the leading teams near the end of the season. Marist withdrew after 6 rounds when they had already defaulted at least 3 matches.
{|
|-
|

Fifth grade (Endean Memorial Shield)
Richmond secured the championship when they defeated Newton 11-0 in the final round. Ponsonby withdrew from the competition after 3 rounds when they had defaulted their matches up to this point. Athletic withdrew after 4 rounds when they too had been defaulting matches. There were 14 rounds played but many results were not reported and so the standings are incomplete. Richmond, City, Point Chevalier, Northcote & Birkenhead, and Newton had the majority of their results reported but 5 or 6 not reported in each case. City won the knockout competition when they beat Newton 18-0 on September 29.
{|
|-
|

Sixth grade A
Ponsonby won the competition. Newton finished runner up after they beat Parnell 5-3 in the final round. Otahuhu won the Hamill Cup which was the knockout competition trophy when they beat Ponsonby 21-0 in the final on October 20. There were very few results reported in the championship although the majority of Ponsonby and Athletics results were reported.
{|
|-
|

Sixth grade B
Athletic won the competition. There were many results not reported however after round 15 on August 18 it was reported that City's 10-0 win over Athletic brought them within 1 competition point of Athletic which gave a clue as to several earlier matches played.
{|
|-
|

Cadet competition
The Cadet competition was won by the 29th Company from Ponsonby. Only around half of the results were reported.
{|
|-
|

Wednesday Competition
The Post and Telegraph side won the Wednesday Competition which was played for by businesses and professions. Post and Telegraph beat Tramways 16-15 on September 26. On September 13 a Taxi Drivers side beat Bakers 21-9 at Carlaw Park. A Bakers player (T. McPherson) broke his ankle and was taken home). On September 20 the Post and Telegraph side played against the Wednesday representative team as curtain-raiser to the Auckland Province - New South Wales match at Carlaw Park. Post and Telegraph won 33 to 11 with future New Zealand international Arthur Singe scoring 2 tries and kicking a conversion. Wally Somers was also in the Post and Telegraph side.
{|
|-
|

Representative season 
The Auckland representative side played 5 matches. They started the season with a match against Wellington in which they ran up a huge score, winning by 71 points to 12. Their second match was played mid week against Hamilton, before two games against South Auckland and finishing the season with a game against an Auckland provincial team.

Auckland challenged South Auckland for the Northern Union Cup which it had lost to the same opponents in 2022. The match was drawn and so South Auckland retained the cup. Auckland later played an Auckland provincial team and won comfortably in front of 7,000 spectators on Carlaw Park. A curtain-raiser was played between the Referees Association and the Junior Advisory Board, and was won by the former by 10 points to 6. In the final full league fixture of the season Auckland played South Auckland again and were this time victorious 25 to 11.

Auckland v Wellington
Every single member of the Auckland team scored points aside from Bill Davidson which was ironic given that he was one of Auckland Rugby League's most prolific point scorers.

Auckland v Hamilton
In the match with Hamilton which, was played midweek, there were no players from the Ponsonby United and City Rovers clubs available as they were playing the Roope Rooster final on the following Saturday.

South Auckland v Auckland (Northern Union Challenge Cup)

Auckland v Auckland Province

Auckland v South Auckland

Auckland representative matches played and scorers

References

External links 
 Auckland Rugby League Official Site

Auckland Rugby League seasons
Auckland Rugby League